Grand Blanc is a city in Genesee County in the U.S. state of Michigan and a suburb of Flint. The population was 7,784 as of the 2020 US Census.

History
The unincorporated village of Grand Blanc, or Grumlaw, was a former Indian campground first settled by Jacob Stevens in spring 1822. Several years later, settlers improved the Indian trail to Saginaw; they laid out and staked it in 1829 as Saginaw Road. Grand Blanc Township was formed in 1833 with area that would become the city.  The township center began to boom in 1864 with the arrival of the railroad (now known as the CSX Saginaw Subdivision). With the post office there, the village was called Grand Blanc Centre by 1873, with the former Grand Blanc assuming the name Gibsonville (not Gibbonsville.)

By 1916, the community (population 400) had a grade school, a private bank, flour mill, an elevator, a creamery, and two churches, the Methodist Episcopal and the Congregational. The community was equipped with electrical lighting.

City
Grand Blanc Centre incorporated as the City of Grand Blanc in 1930. In 1939, the township and the city started a joint fire department. In the 1970s, the Grand Blanc city, township and school district formed a joint parks and recreation department under a commission with 2 members from each entity. In 1973, Grand Blanc-McFarlen Library, was built featuring approximately 45,000 books and offering a host of other materials. 
 
A ballot question in the May 2, 2006 Genesee County general election ended governmental research into a plan to consolidate the city and township governments; 68.62% of city voters opposed consolidation efforts whereas 31.38% were in favor.

On January 20, 2019, the Township Board voted to rescind its joint fire department agreement in 90 days unless a new agreement is reached. After eight decades of a shared fire department with Grand Blanc Township, the city decided to start up their own department starting July 25, 2019, and named a fire chief. Previously, the joint department was funded by each municipal levying a special levy of 0.5 mil for the department and designating 0.5 mil of general levy to the department.

After looking at the lack of management knowledge on the parks and recreation commission in the spring of 2019, the township and city decided to dissolve the commission. In January 2020, the decision was formalized in January 2020 with the township taking over the department to provide services to both municipalities. The city would go on to develop its own parks plan before starting its own department.

Geography

Demographics

2020 census 
As of the 2020 US Census, there were 8,091 people, 3,623 households, and 2,026 families residing in the city. The racial makeup of the city was 82.7% White, 13.1% African American, 1.1% Asian, and 2.2% from two or more races. Hispanic or Latino of any race were 3.5% of the population.

Of 3,623 households, 27.5% had children under the age of 18 living with them, 39.4% were married couples living together, 14% had a female householder with no husband present, and 44.1% were non-families. 37.2% of all households were made up of individuals, and 15.5% had someone living alone who was 65 years of age or older. The average household size was 2.19 and the average family size was 2.98.

The city's population as of 2020 census data was 51.2% female and 48.8% male. The median age was 45.5 years.

2010 census
As of the 2010 US Census, there were 8,276 people, 3,566 households, and 2,158 families residing in the city. The racial makeup of the city was 82.5% White, 11.1% African American, 0.4% Native American, 2.8% Asian, 0.4% from other races, and 2.9% from two or more races. Hispanic or Latino of any race were 2.6% of the population.

Of 3,567 households, 28.9% had children under the age of 18 living with them, 43.4% were married couples living together, 13.0% had a female householder with no husband present, and 39.5% were non-families. 34.0% of all households were made up of individuals, and 12.9% had someone living alone who was 65 years of age or older.  The average household size was 2.28 and the average family size was 2.94.

The city's population as of 2010 census data was 53.7% female and 46.3% male. The median age was 39.1 years and the population exhibits a bimodal age distribution with peak age groups at 10-14 and 45–49 years (7.5% and 7.2%, respectively).

2000 census 
As of the 2000 US Census, the median income for a household in the city was $54,099, and the median income for a family was $82,456. Males had a median income of $61,522 versus $31,051 for females. The per capita income for the city was $32,622.  About 3.7% of families and 5.5% of the population were below the poverty line, including 6.3% of those under age 18 and 3.9% of those age 65 or over.

Government
The city has a council-manager form of government. The municipality operates its own water system.

The city is served by various specialized units of government:
Grand Blanc Community Schools
Genesee District Library, which has a branch location, Grand Blanc-McFarlen, in the city owned by the city and township
 Senior Center
Fourth Division B of the 67th District Court of the State of Michigan.

References

External links
, official website

Cities in Genesee County, Michigan
Populated places established in 1823